was a Japanese politician and a member of the National Diet.

Biography 
He was born in Kobayashi, Miyazaki. He graduated from Kagoshima Prefectural Konan High School in 1968.

In 1974, Kosehira became a secretary of Osanori Koyama, a member of the House of Representatives. 

He served as a member of Kobayashi City Assembly for three terms since 1979 and a member of Miyazaki Prefectural Assembly for three terms since 1991.

He belonged to the Liberal Democratic Party.

References 

1949 births
2015 deaths
21st-century Japanese politicians
Members of the House of Councillors (Japan)
Members of the Miyazaki Prefectural Assembly
Liberal Democratic Party (Japan) politicians
Politicians from Miyazaki Prefecture
People from Miyazaki Prefecture